Vizcachani (possibly from Aymara wisk'acha viscacha, -ni a nominal suffix to indicate ownership, "the one with viscacha") is a mountain in the Urubamba mountain range in the Andes of Peru, about  high. It is located in the Cusco Region, Quispicanchi Province, in the districts Camanti and Marcapata. Vizcachani is situated between the lake Jomercocha in the north and the lakes Huaroscocha and Suirococha in the south.

References 

Mountains of Peru
Mountains of Cusco Region